This article contains a list of films produced by the Bollywood film industry based in Mumbai in 2002. Considered one of the worst years of Bollywood with a drop of growth in terms of box-office numbers, Devdas was the only film which was a blockbuster. This year marked success for actors like Shah Rukh Khan, Aishwarya Rai (Devdas) and 1-film-old Bipasha Basu whose Raaz and Mere Yaar Ki Shaadi Hai were successful.

Top-grossing films
The top-grossing films at the Indian box office in 2002.

2002

Notes

External links
 Bollywood films of 2002 at the Internet Movie Database
 Indian Film Songs from the Year 2002 - A look back at 2002 with a focus on the Hindi film song

2002
Bollywood
 Bollywood
2002 in Indian cinema